The Ijtihadi family (or Khandān-e-Ijtihād) is sub-branch of the Naqvis of Darul Ijtihad Jais and Nasirabad. The family uses last name "Naqvi" to denote that they are descendants of the Islamic prophet Muhammad through the lineage of the Imam Ali al-Naqi.

Roots
The famous Oudh family of Sayyids of Jais settled in Rae Bareli during the eleventh century and has remained there ever since. Naqvi Sadats migrated from Subzwar (Iran) and arrived in Jais around 410 Hijri (around 1027 AD). During the reign of Sher Shah Suri, adjacent Patakpur was also inhabited by Momineens and renamed Nasirabad, after Syed Nasirudin Jaisi. Ayattollah Al Uzma Sayyid Dildar Ali Naqvi 'Gufraanmaab Naseerabadi ', his family came to be called Khandan e Ijtihad due to prominence of high-ranking scholars in its midst. Notable religious scholars from this lineage include Syedul Ulema Syed Ali Naqi Naqvi 'Naqqan',zubdat-ul-ulma Molana Syed Agha Mehdi Lakhnavi (Karachi), Raes-ul-Ullema Ayatollah Maulana Syed Kazim Naqvi, Mumtaz ul Ulema Ayatullah ul Uzma Sayyid Murtaza Naqvi, Sadr-Ul-Ulema Ayatullah ul Uzma Sayyid Baqir Naqvi,Maulana Abdul Hasan Naqvi Jannat Ma'ab Ayatullah Syed Mohammad Naqvi, Deputy Syed Ali Akbar Naqvi, Ayatullah Syed Ali Anwar Naqvi (Ali Munawwar), Ayatullah Aqa Hasan Sb, Ayatullah Syed Kalbe Hussain Naqvi, Hujjatul Islam Syed Kalbe Abid Naqvi, Malaz-ul-Ulama Syed Hasan Naqvi, Hujjatul Islam Syed Kalbe Jawwad Naqvi, Hujjatul Islam Syed Hasan Zafar Naqvi (based in Karachi), Allama Nasir Ijtehadi, Allama Dr Mohsin Naqvi, Allama Syed Siraj Ul Hasan Ijtehadi‚ Maulana Syed Sibte Hasan Naqvi, Maulana Dr Syed Mohammad Waris Hasan Naqvi, Dr Kalbe Sadiq, Hujjatul Islam Professor Syed Ali Mohammad Naqvi, Najmul Ulema Syed Ali Naqvi.

Branches
Two main braches of Ijtehadi family are:
 Jaisi Sadaat, i.e. Syeds of Jais
 Nasirabadi Sadaat, i.e. Syeds of Nasirabad

Prominent Ijtehadis 
 Syed Dildar Ali Naqvi Gufraanmaab
 Syed Kalbe Hussain
 Allama Mufti Syed Naseer ul Hussain Ijtehadi (Zakir-e-Sham-e-Ghareeban)
 Syed Sibte Hasan Naqvi
 Maulana  Syed Ali Naqi Naqvi
Maulana Syed Murtuza Naqvi
 Maulana Syed Kazim Naqvi
 Maulana Syed Baqir Naqvi
Maulana Abdul Hasan Naqvi
 Syed Kalbe Abid Naqvi
 Syed Hasan Naqvi
 Syed Mohammad Waris Hasan Naqvi
 Syed Kalbe Sadiq
 Syed Kalbe Jawad Naqvi
 Syed Saif Abbas Naqvi

See also
Abaqati family (or Khandan-e-Abaqat)

References

Further reading
 Tariqh Amadul Saadat published 1884 by Naval Kishor
 Tariq Awadh, Guzashta Lucknow page 102, by abdul haleem Sharar (1926)
 Intesarul Islam by Tariqul Ulema
 Aina Haq-nama' foil. 30, by Syed Ijaz Husain Kanturi
 Swaneh Hayat, third edition by Agba Mehdi and other, Pakistan
 Tazkarutul Muthaqeen, Persian. Pub. Meerut 1931
 Rooh Adab Part-III, By Ghansi Ram M.A.
 Swaneh Hayat Ghufraan-Maab, Third addition by Agha Mehdi, Pakistan
 Ainahe-haqnama, foll. 30a-b Syed Ijaz Husain Kanturi and others
 Ainaye Haq. Swaneh Hayat G-Maaf, third edition by Agha Mehdi, member Khusoosi Musanafeen Pakistan March, 1982

External links
Official website of a section of Ijtihadi family
Nasirabad Ghufraanmaab Foundation, Raebareli

 
People from Lucknow